Marco Vivarelli (born 11 February 1963) is an Italian economist, full professor and director of the Department of Economic Policy at the Università Cattolica del Sacro Cuore, Milan.

Biography 
Marco Vivarelli received his Laurea in 1987 from the Bocconi University, Milan and his Ph.D. in 1992 from the Science Policy Research Unit (SPRU) at Sussex University.

Professorial Fellow at UNU-MERIT, Maastricht.

Research Fellow at IZA, Bonn.

Fellow of the Global Labor Organization (GLO).

Member of the Scientific Executive Board of the Eurasia Business and Economics Society (EBES, Istanbul).

Member of the International Board of the Austrian Institute of Economic Research (WIFO, Vienna).

He has been scientific consultant for the International Labour Office, World Bank, the Inter-American Development Bank, the United Nations Industrial Development Organization and the European Commission.

Editor-in-Chief of the Eurasian Business Review.

Editor of Small Business Economics.

Associate editor of Industrial and Corporate Change

Associate editor of Economics E-Journal.

Member of the editorial board of Sustainability.

Member of the editorial review board of the International Entrepreneurship and Management Journal

He has served as referee for more than 100 international journals.

Since October 2010 to September 2013 he has been honorary professor at the SPRU-University of Sussex.

Since April 2005 to December 2012 he has been external associate at the CSGR-University of Warwick.

Since February 2004 to December 2009 he has been external senior research fellow at the Max Planck Institute of Economics in Jena.

Since July 2007 to December 2007 and since July 2008 to February 2009 he has served as senior scientist at the European Commission-Joint Research Centre-Institute for Prospective Technological Studies in Seville.

Since June 2002 to May 2005 he has served as senior research economist at the International Labour Office – Geneva.

Scientific research impact 
According to GOOGLE SCHOLAR, his works collected more than 11,000 citations (h-index=59).

According to SCOPUS, his works collected more than 3,500 citations (h-index=38).

According to REPEC-IDEAS, he is among the global top 2% authors and he is in the top ten Italian economists (publications in the last 10 years).

According to VIA-Academy, he is ranked among the top Italian scientists worldwide (16th among economists).

Research Focuses 
In 1995 Vivarelli published The Economics of Technology and Employment: Theory and Empirical Evidence, Elgar, Cheltenham, reprinted 1997.

He is author of more than 70 scientific publications in refereed international journals.

His current research interests include the relationship between innovation, employment and skills; the labour market and income distribution impacts of globalization; the entry and post-entry performance of newborn firms. From a methodological point of view, his articles are based on microeconometric evidence.

As far as the link between innovation and employment is concerned, his research provides theoretical arguments and empirical evidence showing that the mainstream optimism about the full compensation of technological unemployment by market forces is unfounded. Indeed, product innovation is generally labour friendly but process innovation (for instance robots) may negatively affect employment, while compensation may be affected by several market failures. As a policy implication, product innovation in high-tech and emerging sectors should be fostered and safety nets should be framed for the possible victims of automation.

As far as globalization is concerned, his research output provides evidence that globalization may have controversial effect in terms of employment, skills and income distribution. In contrast with the mainstream optimism about the overall positive impact of free trade and FDI, globalization - combined with technology transfer - may imply job losses and increasing inequality (in particular in the developing countries). As a policy implication, controlled and gradual globalization should be encouraged and coupled with proper social measures.

As far as the entry and post-entry performance of newborn firms are concerned, the empirical results of his research show that - contrary to the entrepreneurial vulgate - only a tiny minority of new firms are innovative and that most of new ventures are doomed to early failure. As a policy implication, "erga omnes" policies fostering firm formation should be avoided, while entry and post-entry subsidies should be targeted and very selective.

Honours 
Member of the Academia Europaea (2019) 

Cavaliere Ordine al Merito della Repubblica Italiana (2009)

References

External links 
 Marco Vivarelli personal web page
 Prof. Marco Vivarelli page in the Università Cattolica del Sacro Cuore website

Italian economists
Academic staff of the Università Cattolica del Sacro Cuore
1963 births
Living people